General elections were held in Guyana on 28 August 2006. They were initially scheduled for 4 August, but were moved to 28 August after President Jagdeo dissolved the National Assembly on 2 May. The result was a victory for the ruling People's Progressive Party/Civic (PPP/C), which won 36 of the 65 seats in the National Assembly.

Electoral system
The 65 members of the National Assembly were elected by closed list proportional representation in two groups; 25 members were elected from the 10 electoral districts based on the regions, and 40 elected from a single nationwide constituency. Seats were allocated using the Hare quota.

The President was elected by a first-past-the-post double simultaneous vote system, whereby each list nominated a presidential candidate and the presidential election itself was won by the candidate of the list having a plurality.

There were a total of 1999 polling places, open from 06:00 to 18:00, and election day was declared a national holiday to encourage voter turnout.

Campaign
The PPP/C of incumbent President Bharrat Jagdeo was ahead in the opinion polls and was expected to keep its majority in the National Assembly. The main campaign topics were crime, drugs and the economy.

Conduct
Observation teams from the Organization of American States (OAS), the Caribbean Community (CARICOM), the Commonwealth Observer Group, and the Carter Center attended the elections. Troops patrolled the streets in order to prevent violence.

Results

Elected members

Aftermath
By virtue of being the leader of the party winning the most seats, PPP/C leader Bharrat Jagdeo was re-elected as President. He was sworn in on 9 September. The National Assembly met for the first time on 28 September, with Ralph Ramkarran re-elected as Speaker.

References

Elections in Guyana
Guyana
2006 in Guyana
August 2006 events in South America